Il disco volante is a 1964 Italian comic science fiction film with mockumentary elements directed by Tinto Brass and starring Alberto Sordi. The film features the renowned comedian in four distinct roles as a dim-witted Carabinieri brigadiere, a cheesepairing accountant, a decadent count, and an alcoholic priest. Involving characters from different social strata, Il disco volante is effectively a satire of the Italian society, particularly the people of Brass's adopted home region Veneto.

Plot
The sergeant of the Carabinieri of a Venetian village is charged with carrying out investigations on the arrival of a UFO of extraterrestrial origin. During the investigation he finds himself questioning a group of people who claim to have actually seen the Martians. In truth, only Vittoria, a poor widowed peasant with numerous children, manages to get hold of a Martian, which she sells to her effeminate master. His mother, however, suppresses the Martian, accuses the peasant woman of fraud and sends her son to an asylum. Here, sooner or later, other characters involved in the story will also arrive, most recently the sergeant himself, because they are all considered visionaries. The sensational event is therefore soon buried in general indifference.

Cast
Alberto Sordi: Vincenzo Berruti / Dario Marsicano / Don Giuseppe / Count Momi Crosara 
Monica Vitti: Dolores
Silvana Mangano: Vittoria Laconiglia
Eleonora Rossi Drago: Maria Meneghello
Liana Del Balzo: Mother of Dolores
Guido Celano: Half brother of Vittoria
Lars Bloch: Physicist

References

External links

1964 films
1960s science fiction comedy films
Films set in Veneto
Films directed by Tinto Brass
Mars in film
Italian science fiction comedy films
1964 comedy films
1960s Italian films